Santa Cruz Formation may refer to:

 Santa Cruz Formation an Early Miocene geologic formation in Argentina and Chile, defining the Santacrucian
 Santa Cruz Formation, Philippines, a Middle Pleistocene geologic formation in the Zambales Mountains in the Philippines

See also
 Santa Cruz Mudstone, a Late Miocene geologic formation in California
 Santa Cruz Member, a member of the Late Jurassic Unidade Bombarral formation in Portugal